Bloodmoon is a 1990 Australian slasher film directed by Alec Mills and starring Leon Lissek, Christine Amor, Ian Williams, Helen Thomson, and Craig Cronin. It was featured in the documentary Not Quite Hollywood: The Wild, Untold Story of Ozploitation!.

The title refers to the Hunter's moon, the first full moon after the Harvest Moon.

Plot

Religious Sister Mary-Ellen keeps an eye over her charges at Saint Elizabeth's, an elite Catholic girls' school that has a chapel and boarding dormitories. Mrs. Sheffield was the newly arrived and appointed headmistress, and her husband commenced serving as the school's science teacher.

There is some conflict between the youth of Winchester School, a private school 'for young men', and the local youth. This first was an altercation at the nearby beach signed as 'Coopers Beach', and during the school dance when fire hoses were used.

Young couples meet in the nearby forest, the school's lovers' lane. One day, young people start to turn up dead under dramatic circumstances. These events began with sixteen-year-old Jackie and Winchester private boys school student Richard Hampton.

At the school dance, a glam rock band plays while the students from the two schools fraternise. One couple goes into the nearby forest when the hint of the murderer appears, holding a circle of barbed wire. However, the arrival of polka-dot-dressed Gretchen with Winchester's Stuart/Stewart disturbed both the first couple and the murderer. The murderer returns and dispatches Stuart.

On the Sunday Mrs Sheffield comes together in her bed with one of the Winchester students in the teacher's residence, before her science teacher husband returns. He is aware of her ongoing infidelities, while she treats him with disdain. Mr Sheffield takes a knife to the yearbook photograph of a student, Mary. At a nearby waterfall and watering hole, Mary and Kevin share a kiss. Two students, Michelle and Jennifer, also enter the science classroom looking for the Monday examination paper, and chances on a bottle of fingers and eyeballs; a barb-wire garrote hanging on the cupboard door. Michelle is bashed by Sheffield, Jennifer slashing him with a knife. She escapes but falls down the stairs; where Sheffield dispatches her with the knife. With his blood-soaked shirt, Sheffield sees Kevin return Mary to the school, Kevin and Mary then kissing. When the police officer attends, Sheffield pretends to call his wife to come to the building, but indicating she was feeling ill. He lamented missing Boston (the officer however noticing photographs in the room however show California vehicle number plates).

Sheffield then cuts the outgoing telephone lines, calls Mary, and suggests he is passing on a message about Kevin, to meet 'him in the woods at 9:00 p.m.' beside the auditorium. The police officer returns to the station and has a call put through to California, aware earlier that Sheffield was making a fake call. The officer has connected students murdered in California to the disappearance of Saint Elizabeth's students. Separately a female student, Linda, makes a public payphone call to Kevin with a message from Mary, as required by Sheffield before he ceases Linda's life.

Mary heads off to the lovers' lane in the rain Sunday night. Myles Sheffield watched Mary leave, but Virginia Sheffield arrives to go out for dinner and belittles him; he also admits he has 'done it again'. She leaves, and he goes to the science room to get the garrote when confronted in that room by the Sister. He then hits her.

Meanwhile, Mary has arrived in the woods. A police officer finds the murdered schoolgirl in the telephone booth. Kevin arrives at the lovers' lane, and Virginia Sheffield is packing her luggage. Virginia's student lover returns to her bedroom; she tries to pack while he tries to cavort; she also protests and warns that 'all the goblins are coming out tonight'.

The police officer interrupts the choir in the school chapel and attends the Sheffield residence to be reprimanded by Mrs. Sheffield for intruding. He fires a revolver shot to warn her to speak the truth. The officer then heads to the woods, as Myles Sheffield tries to garrote Kevin, and Mary tries to hit Sheffield with a stick. As Sheffield is strangling Mary and is about to use a knife, the police officer draws his firearm before being fatally stabbed in the chest by Sheffield. When Sheffield goes toward Mary, Sister Mary-Ellen advances and throws a bottle of liquid onto him, which drives him away before she slumps down.

A blood-soaked Sheffield stumbles back to a residence of the local priest and takes a shotgun from a cabinet. With lightning around, he returns to his residence finding Virginia there. A shotgun is discharged, then again.

Cast 

Listed by credit.

 Leon Lissek as Myles Sheffield, Saint Elizabeth's science teacher, and a lover of cats
 Christine Amor as Virginia Sheffield, Saint Elizabeth's new headmistress, and wife of Myles
 Ian Williams as Kevin Lynch, a local Coopers Beach boy with an interest in Mary Huston
 Helen Thomson as Mary Huston, Saint Elizabeth's student, vice-captain of Wills House, whose actress mother resides in California.  Mary at one point calls her mother in the USA on telephone (213) 555 2716
 Craig Cronin as Matt Desmond, the police sergeant (credited as )
 Hazel Howson as Sister Mary-Ellen, a puritan but insightful nun
 Suzie MacKenzie as Michelle, Saint Elizabeth's student concerned about her grades
 Anya Molina as Jennifer, Saint Elizabeth's student and associate of Michelle
 Brian Moll as Mr Gordian, Winchester's long-time headmaster
 Stephen Bergin as Mark
  Broadway as Scott
 Samantha Rittson as Gretchen, Saint Elizabeth's student
 Tess Pike as Kylie
 Jo Munro as Jackie, girlfriend of Winchester School's Richard Hampton
 Michelle Doake as Linda, who made a public telephone box call
 Chris Uhlmann as Chip
 Justin Ractliffe as Zits
 Warwick Brown as Billy, a local boy
 Gregory Pamment as Rich
 Sueyan Cox as Sandy Desmond, wife of the police sergeant
 Narelle Arcidiacono as Mrs Bacon
 Michael Adams as Mr Owens
 Sue Lawson as Mrs Owens
 Jonathan Hardy as the mayor
 Elizabeth Williams as a teacher
 David Clendenning as a teacher
 Jane Dormaier as a teacher
 Helen Strube as a teacher
 Les Evans as Kevin's father
 Ray Turner as a police officer
 Shawn Kristofer as a police officer (also the film's production runner)
 Kate Riley as the police sergeant's daughter
 Sean Anderson as the police sergeant's baby son
 Kesha Loy
 Lisa Hamilton
 Matthew Smith as Murphy, a local kid
 Karen Miers as Susan
 Melodie Brutnall as the stunt double for 'Jennifer' (who falls down the stairs)
 Ashley Burgess, Chris Hawkins, Scott Hogan, Ben Wyatt as stunt personnel
 Lindy-Jo Free as choir mistress
 Stuartholme Choir as the Saint Elizabeth's school and chapel choir

Production

The film was shot on the Gold Coast, Brisbane, and the Warner-Roadshow Studios. Many of the school shots are from the grounds at Marist College Ashgrove, and the dance scene was filmed at Mount Saint Michaels with local students (eg Michael Cuddihy and Michael McMullen) used as extras.  The production uses a pre-1990s Queensland Police Force uniform for the local officer, having the shoulder patch and rank chevrons on the sleeve; the police vehicle having the standard plain sticker with police wording on the front doors.  The officer has the 'sergeant first class' insignia.

The title song Bloodmoon was set to music by Brian May, lyrics by Hunt Downs, and sung by Vice.

Amor, MacKenzie, and Moll starred together in the 1990 Australian horror movie, Dead Sleep.  This also included Cronnin who was billed as in that movie as Craig Cronin.

Release

In Australia, the film was released with a "fright break" towards the end where the audience had a chance to walk out and claim a refund.

Critical reception 

AllMovie called it a "silly Australian slasher film". Jim Schembri wrote in Cinema Papers that:
It is an unspeakably funny film, but in the saddest possible way. It is a film promoted as a horror film, and it is for anyone with any faith left in Australian mainstream film... For a film as awful, as cliche ridden, as derivative as unimaginative and as poorly made as Bloodmoon to be made in Australia in 1990 is a cause of national mourning.

References

External links 
 
Bloodmoon at Oz Movies

1990 films
Australian horror films
1990 horror films
Australian slasher films
Films set in Brisbane
Films shot in Brisbane
Films scored by Brian May (composer)
1990s English-language films
1990s slasher films